Oliver "Buddy" Pough  is an American football coach and former player.  He is the current head football coach at South Carolina State University, a position he has held since 2002.  He has led the South Carolina State Bulldogs football team to eight Mid-Eastern Athletic Conference (MEAC) titles, in 2004, 2008, 2009, 2010, 2013, 2014, 2019, and 2021.

Head coaching record

College

*conf champs in 2019 due to NCAA sanctions on Florida A&M

References

External links
 South Carolina State profile

Year of birth missing (living people)
Living people
American football offensive linemen
South Carolina Gamecocks football coaches
South Carolina State Bulldogs football coaches
South Carolina State Bulldogs football players
High school football coaches in South Carolina
African-American coaches of American football
African-American players of American football
21st-century African-American people